Abdulmajeed Abdullah Al-Swat (born 21 April 1995) is a Saudi international footballer who plays as a midfielder for Saudi Arabian club Al-Faisaly.

External links

References

1995 births
Living people
People from Taif
Saudi Arabian footballers
Association football midfielders
Al Hilal SFC players
Al-Taawoun FC players
Ittihad FC players
Al-Faisaly FC players
Saudi Professional League players
Saudi First Division League players
Saudi Arabia international footballers